Satureja gillesii is a plant in the family Lamiaceae (the mint family). Certain organic chemicals are derived from this species, which are useful to humans. S. gillesii occurs in parts of South America, one instance being in central Chile in the La Campana National Park area, in association with the endangered Chilean wine palm, Jubaea chilensis.

References
 John Buckingham, D.C. Ayres, et al. 1994. Dictionary of Natural Products, CRC Press, 1018 pages
 C. Michael Hogan. 2008. Chilean Wine Palm: Jubaea chilensis, GlobalTwitcher.com, ed. Nicklas Stromberg

Line notes

Lamiaceae